Bandırma Basketbol İhtisas Kulübü (English: Bandırma Basketball Specialization Club), for sponsorship reasons  Teksüt Bandırma, was a Turkish professional basketball team from Bandırma, Turkey. Their home arena is the Kara Ali Acar Sport Hall. 

Founded in 1994 as Banvit B.K., the team played in the highest level Basketbol Süper Ligi since 2004. The team reached the Süper Ligi finals in 2013 and won the Turkish Cup in 2017. Banvit was also a regular in European competitions, with their best result being Basketball Champions League runners-up in 2017.

The team was dissolved in 2021 due to financial issues.

History
The Banvit basketball club was founded in 1994, by workers at Banvit, a meat company based in Bandirma. The team began playing in the Turkish regional leagues in 1998, and were promoted to the Turkish second division in 2001. In 2004, the team was promoted to the Turkish top-tier level BSL, as champions of the second division.

The team played in the European-wide fourth-tier level FIBA EuroCup Challenge, in their first BSL season, and reached the league's semifinal. The team has reached the semifinal of the BSL five times, and reached the final of the Turkish Cup twice. In the 2012–13 season, the team beat Beşiktaş, in the quarterfinal series, and beat Anadolu Efes in the semifinal series of the BSL playoffs, and reached the league's finals, where they lost against Galatasaray Medical Park 4–1. In the next season, Banvit qualified for the Qualifying Round of the EuroLeague 2013–14 season. But they lost in the qualification round against Telenet Oostende, and were dropped down to the second-tier level EuroCup.

In the 2016–17 season, Banvit played in the inaugural season of the Basketball Champions League. In the competition, it reached the championship game of the Final Four in Tenerife, Banvit's first European final. Banvit lost 63–59 to host team Iberostar Tenerife.

On 1 June 2019, Banvit B.B. changed its club name to Bandırma B.İ.K. On 19 July, a sponsorship agreement was announced which would name the team Teksüt Bandırma for the 2019–20 season. However, on August 21, 2020, Teksüt Bandırma announced that they withdrew from Basketbol Süper Ligi due to financial issues.

Sponsorship names

Due to sponsorship reasons the club has been known as:
1994–2019 Banvit B.K.
2019–2020 Teksüt Bandırma

Honours

Domestic competitions

 Turkish Super League
 Runners-up (1): 2012–13
 Turkish Cup
 Winners (1): 2017
 Runners-up (2): 2007, 2012
 Turkish Super Cup
 Runners-up (1): 2017

European competitions
 Basketball Champions League
 Runners-up (1): 2016–17

Other competitions
 TUBAD Basketball Tournament
 Winners (1): 2014

Season by season

Players

FIBA Hall of Famers

Notable players

References

External links
Official Website 
Eurobasket.com Page
TBLStat.net Profile

Bandırma
Balıkesir Province
Basketball teams established in 1994
Turkish Basketball Super League teams
Basketball teams disestablished in 2020
Defunct basketball teams in Turkey